Okaihau railway station was a station on the Okaihau Branch in New Zealand.

References

Defunct railway stations in New Zealand